Canton Airport can refer to:
Guangzhou Baiyun International Airport
Guangzhou Baiyun International Airport (former)
Akron-Canton Regional Airport